Mohammed Aslam Ahsan Chaudhary (born March 15, 1942) is a Pakistani Norwegian politician for the Labour Party.

Born in Punjab, British India, he migrated to Sweden in May 1971 and to Oslo, Norway in August the same year. He took a job in the industry, and became active in his trade union. He eventually became involved in local politics, and was elected to serve in Lørenskog municipal council in 1983, as one of the first Asian immigrants to Norway.

He has also been a member of Norway's Contact Committee for Immigrants and the Authorities. He has become known nationwide as a debater in the public sphere, and won the Fritt Ord Award for freedom of expression in 2002. In 2009 he was awarded the HM The King's Medal of Merit in Gold.

References

1942 births
Living people
Pakistani emigrants to Norway
Labour Party (Norway) politicians
Akershus politicians
Recipients of the King's Medal of Merit in gold
People from Lørenskog